Solidor Tower (in French tour Solidor) is a strengthened keep with three linked towers, located in the estuary of the river Rance in Brittany. 

It was built between 1369 and 1382 by John V, Duke of Brittany (i.e. Jean  IV in French) to control access to the Rance at a time when the city of Saint-Malo did not recognize his authority. Over the centuries the tower lost its military interest and became a jail. It is now a museum celebrating Breton sailors exploring Cape Horn. 

The Solidor Tower is located in the former town of Saint-Servan, which merged with Saint-Malo and Paramé in 1967.

It is featured in the 1957 Wendy Toye film True as a Turtle starring John Gregson, Cecil Parker, June Thorburn and Keith Michell.

References

External links
 Museum of the History of the Town and the Pays Malouin 

Castles in Brittany
Buildings and structures in Ille-et-Vilaine
Saint-Malo
Museums in Ille-et-Vilaine
Local museums in France
Monuments historiques of Ille-et-Vilaine